Eike is a given name and surname. Notable people with the name include:

Given name
 Eike Batista (born 1956), entrepreneur
 Eike Bram (born 1965), handball player
 Eike Duarte (born 1997), actor
 Eike Duckwitz (born 1980), field hockey player
 Eike Geisel (1945–1997), journalist and essayist
 Eike Christian Hirsch (1937–2022), journalist and author
 Eike Immel (born 1960), footballer and manager
 Eike Moriz  or Ike Moriz (born 1972), singer, songwriter and actor
 Eike Mund (born 1988), footballer
 Eike Onnen (born 1982), high jumper
 Eike Pulver or Astrid Frank (born 1945), German actress
 Eike of Repgow (c. 1180 – c. 1233), medieval German administrator
 Eike Wilm Schulte (born 1939), operatic baritone

Surname
 James Eike (1911–1983), American birdwatcher
 Roberta Eike, American oceanographer and marine geologist
 Sten Ove Eike (born 1981), footballer

German masculine given names